This is a list of assets owned by CTVglobemedia upon its acquisition to Bell Canada in 2011.

In early 2000, Bell Canada Enterprises (BCE) acquired CTV Inc. and bought The Globe and Mail from Thomson Corporation. The resulting company was named Bell Globemedia Inc. In January 2007, after BCE reduced its ownership in the company, it was renamed CTVglobemedia. In 2011, the Canadian Radio-television and Telecommunications Commission approved Bell Canada's re-acquisition of CTVglobemedia for CA$1.3 billion. CTVglobemedia was subsequently renamed Bell Media on 1 April 2011.

Television

CTV Inc.

Conventional television

CTV
 Calgary, Alberta - CFCN
 Edmonton, Alberta - CFRN
 Halifax, Nova Scotia - CJCH
 Kitchener, Ontario - CKCO
 Moncton, New Brunswick - CKCW
 Montreal, Quebec - CFCF
 North Bay, Ontario - CKNY
 Ottawa, Ontario - CJOH
 Prince Albert, Saskatchewan - CIPA
 Regina, Saskatchewan - CKCK
 Saint John, New Brunswick - CKLT
 Saskatoon, Saskatchewan - CFQC
 Sault Ste. Marie, Ontario - CHBX
 Sudbury, Ontario - CICI
 Sydney, Nova Scotia - CJCB
 Timmins, Ontario - CITO
 Toronto, Ontario - CFTO
 Vancouver, British Columbia - CIVT
 Winnipeg, Manitoba - CKY
 Yorkton, Saskatchewan - CICC

Speciality channels
 Business News Network (BNN)
 The Comedy Network
 CTV News Channel
 MTV
 OLN - 33% and managing partner (remainder sold to Rogers Communications in 2007)
 Travel + Escape (sold to Glassbox Television in 2010)

CTV Limited
On 22 June 2007, CHUM Limited merged with CTVglobemedia and was renamed CTV Limited. (Regulatory approval of this merger was made conditional on the sale of CHUM's five Citytv stations to Rogers Communications.)

Conventional television

Specialty channels
 Bravo
 CP24
 E! (under licence from Comcast/NBCUniversal)
 PunchMuch
 MuchMusic
 MuchMore
 Space
 BookTelevision
 Comedy Gold
 MuchRetro
 MuchVibe
 MuchLoud
 MTV2
 Fashion Television
 Investigation Discovery (under licence from Discovery Communications)

CTV Specialty Television
CTV Specialty Television Inc. is jointly owned by Bell Media and ESPN, with 70% owned by Bell Media and 30% owned by ESPN (itself 80% owned by The Walt Disney Company and 20% owned by Hearst Corporation).

Any percentages below refer to the portion of each channel owned by CTV Specialty, with the balance in each case being owned by additional partners such as Discovery Communications.

 The Sports Network (TSN)
TSN2
 Réseau des sports (RDS)
RDS Info
RDS2
 Discovery Channel — 80% and managing partner
 Animal Planet — 80% and managing partner
 Discovery Science — 80% and managing partner
Discovery World — 80% and managing partner
 ESPN Classic
 NHL Network — 21.42% and managing partner
 Viewers Choice — 24.95%

Radio

CHUM Radio
CHUM Radio was the wholly-owned radio broadcasting division of CTVglobemedia (and remains a division of Bell Media). Through CHUM Radio, CTVglobemedia also owned CHUM Radio Sales.

CHUM Radio owned and operated these following stations:

Print
 The Globe and Mail — sold to The Woodbridge Company in 2011

Other assets
 Access Media Group (dissolved in 2008)
 Agincourt Productions Inc. — CTV's in-house production company
 Autohound (unknown equity interest)
 Canada's Olympic Broadcast Media Consortium (80%) — produces Canadian broadcasts of 2010 and 2012 Olympic Games
 CTV Music — music publishing
 Dome Productions (35% through CTV Specialty Television Inc, which owns 50% total) — production facilities
 Exploration Production Inc. and Exploration Distribution Inc. (56.06% owned by CTVglobemedia) — Discovery Channel Canada's in-house production and distribution companies
 Megawheels Technologies Inc. (4%)

See also

 Lists of corporate assets

References

External links
 CTVglobemedia website — now redirects to the Bell Media website.

.
CTVglobemedia